Albert Costa and Carlos Moyá were the defending champions, but retired in the deciding tiebreak in the final against Cédric Pioline and Fabrice Santoro.

Draw

Final

Group A
Standings are determined by: 1. number of wins; 2. number of matches; 3. in three-players-ties, percentage of sets won, or of games won; 4. steering-committee decision.

Group B
Standings are determined by: 1. number of wins; 2. number of matches; 3. in three-players-ties, percentage of sets won, or of games won; 4. steering-committee decision.

References
Main Draw

Legends Under 45 Doubles